Ten Lake Township is a township in Beltrami County, Minnesota, United States. The population was 1,026 as of the 2010 census.

Geography

Unincorporated towns
 Andrusia at 
(This list is based on USGS data and may include former settlements.)

Lakes
 Big Lake (south quarter)
 Blue Sky Lake
 Buck Lake
 Cass Lake
 Cass Lake (west quarter)
 Drewery Lake
 Little Lost Lake
 Lake Andrusia
 Lost Lake
 Luck Lake
 Mission Lake
 Silver Lake
 Ten Lake
 Windigo Lake

Adjacent townships
 Sugar Bush Township (north)
 Moose Lake Township (northeast)
 Pike Bay Township, Cass County (south)
 Farden Township, Hubbard County (southwest)
 Frohn Township (west)
 Turtle River Township (northwest)

Demographics
As of the census of 2000, there were 1,005 people, 312 households, and 249 families residing in the township. There were 502 housing units at an average density of 22.1/sq mi (8.5/km). The racial makeup of the township was 35.32% White, 61.99% Native American, 0.10% from other races, and 2.59% from two or more races. Hispanic or Latino of any race were 0.60% of the population.

There were 312 households, out of which 44.6% had children under the age of 18 living with them, 44.6% were married couples living together, 27.2% had a female householder with no husband present, and 19.9% were non-families. 14.1% of all households were made up of individuals, and 5.8% had someone living alone who was 65 years of age or older.  The average household size was 3.22 and the average family size was 3.41.

In the township the population was spread out, with 36.8% under the age of 18, 8.0% from 18 to 24, 24.2% from 25 to 44, 22.7% from 45 to 64, and 8.4% who were 65 years of age or older.  The median age was 31 years. For every 100 females, there were 97.1 males.  For every 100 females age 18 and over, there were 93.0 males.

The median income for a household in the township was $33,906, and the median income for a family was $34,896. Males had a median income of $29,125 versus $20,573 for females. The per capita income for the township was $11,853.  About 17.7% of families and 21.6% of the population were below the poverty line, including 28.4% of those under age 18 and 4.8% of those age 65 or over.

References
 United States National Atlas
 United States Census Bureau 2007 TIGER/Line Shapefiles
 United States Board on Geographic Names (GNIS)

Townships in Beltrami County, Minnesota
Townships in Minnesota